Romain Philippoteaux (born 2 March 1988) is a French professional footballer who plays as a winger for Indian Super League club NorthEast United.

Career
On 28 June 2019, it was confirmed, that Philippoteaux had signed a three-year contract with Nîmes Olympique.

On 3 September 2021, he returned to Dijon on a season-long loan.

NorthEast United
On 6 September 2022, he signed a 2-year contract with Indian Super League club NorthEast United.

Career statistics

External links

References

1988 births
Living people
Association football midfielders
French footballers
Ligue 1 players
Ligue 2 players
Championnat National 2 players
US Pontet Grand Avignon 84 players
Dijon FCO players
FC Lorient players
AJ Auxerre players
Nîmes Olympique players
Stade Brestois 29 players
NorthEast United FC players